C. H. Ostenfeld Glacier, is one of the major glaciers in northern Greenland. 

This glacier was first mapped by Lauge Koch in 1917 during Knud Rasmussen's 1916-1918 Second Thule Expedition to north Greenland and was named after Danish botanist Carl Hansen Ostenfeld (1873–1931), author of Flora of Greenland and its origin.

Geography 
The C. H. Ostenfeld Glacier originates in the Greenland Ice Cap. It is roughly southeast–northwest oriented and has its terminus at the head of Victoria Fjord. There are three nunataks near its terminus. The glacier's last stretch is a floating tongue within the fjord. The Brikkerne Glacier joins from the right near the head of the fjord.

Bibliography
Anthony K. Higgins, North Greenland Glacier Velocities and Calf Ice Production
A Review of Recent Changes in Major Marine-Terminating Outlet Glaciers

See also
List of glaciers in Greenland

References

External links
Arctic Sea Ice Forum
Icy Seas
Glaciers of Greenland